Team Rensi Motorsports was a NASCAR Nationwide Series team owned by Ronnie Russell, Ed Rensi, Gary Weisbaum, and formerly Sam Rensi. The team has also competed in the Winston Cup Series, Craftsman Truck Series, and ARCA racing series.

Ed Rensi, who was president and CEO of McDonald's USA from 1991 to 1997, has been Team Rensi Racing's Chairman and CEO since October 1998.

Car No. 24 history
Jason Keller (2005)
The No. 24 team debuted in 2005 as the No. 35 being driven by veteran Jason Keller with sponsorship from McDonald's. Despite a ninth-place finish in points, Keller struggled to run up front, and he left for Phoenix Racing at the end of the season.

Regan Smith (2006)
Regan Smith took his place in 2006, and had one top-ten finish. Smith departed from the ride for Ginn Racing. Hamilton returned to Rensi to drive the No. 35 for the 2007 season, finishing sixth in points.

Bobby Hamilton Jr. (2007)
During the 2007–08 offseason, McDonald's ended its sponsorship of the No. 35 and David Gilliland took the FreeCreditReport.com sponsorship of the No. 25 car to the NASCAR Sprint Cup Series. Team Rensi signed Smithfield Foods as prime sponsor of the No. 25 car, allowing Hamilton to move to that team. The 35 returned late in 2008 with Danny O'Quinn driving, but he failed to finish both races he ran.

Eric McClure (2009-2010)
The car made a return to full-time racing in 2009, with Eric McClure bringing both Hefty sponsorship and the No. 24 over from Front Row Motorsports.

In 2010, McClure and Hefty remained with the team. After surgery on his foot, McClure was relieved by driver Chris Cook at Road America. D. J. Kennington raced the car at Montreal to an 11th-place finish, as McClure sat out of the race due to a concussion the prior week from Bristol. McClure and Hefty will leave the team for 2011, citing performance issues and a lacking budget from Team Rensi.

Kevin Lepage (2011)
For 2011, Kevin Lepage drove the car for the first several races of the season.  Lepage ran full races initially, but was forced to withdraw from Bristol after a practice crash and did not arrive at Talladega. They were last seen at Texas.

Car No. 25 history
Early years (1999-2000)
The team, then known as Team Rensi Motorsports first joined the Busch Series in 1999, fielding the No. 25 Dura Lube Chevrolet Monte Carlo for Jeff Finley. They finished 13th at the season opening NAPA Auto Parts 300, but Finley failed to qualify for the next few races, and he and the team drifted apart. Kenny Wallace took over at Nashville, and drove 18 races that season for the team, posting nine finishes of seventh or better. Rick Fuller, David Blankenship and Scott Lagasse drove two races a piece for the team as well, and they finished eighteenth in owner's points that season. Wallace returned again in 2000 with new sponsor Lance Snacks, and posted eight top-ten finishes, his best finish was 4th twice at Bristol races. Blankenship and Andy Santerre drove in the races that Wallace did not run, with Santerre finishing 3rd at Pikes Peak.

Chad Chaffin (2001)
In 2001, the U.S. Marines signed on as sponsor. Since Wallace had moved onto Innovative Motorsports, Chad Chaffin began the year with the team, but after he couldn't finish higher than 16th at Atlanta, he was released. Rookie David Donohue took over at the Pepsi 300 Presented by Mapco/Williams, but he too, struggled in the ride, and was released after 12 starts. Randy Tolsma finished the season for the team, who finished 29th in points that year.

Bobby Hamilton Jr. (2002-2004)
After 2001, Rensi switched to Ford Tauruses and signed Bobby Hamilton Jr. to drive. After a slow start, the two began to gain momentum, and they picked up their first win at the Busch 200, and finished eighth in points. This success carried over into the next season as well, as Hamilton won four races and finished fourth in points. They would not be able to win in 2004, and after the Cabela's 250, Hamilton left to drive for PPI Motorsports at the Nextel Cup level, and Mike McLaughlin took over for the rest of the season, finishing second at the Stacker 200 Presented by YJ Stinger.

Ashton Lewis (2005-2006)
In 2005, Rensi signed Ashton Lewis to drive the 25 car. Lewis had five top-ten finishes and a fourteenth-place finish in points. After many poor performances, however, Lewis was released and the Marines left as a sponsor.

David Gilliland and Richard Johns (2007)
For 2007, credit report site FreeCreditReport.com signed on as sponsor, with Nextel Cup driver David Gilliland and head engineer Richard Johns originally slated to share the ride. During the RoadLoans.com 200 weekend, Gilliland announced his departure from the No. 25, citing that he needed to focus on his Yates Racing No. 38 Cup ride. Johns drove for the remainder of the season.

Bobby Hamilton Jr. (2008)
The team returned Hamilton to the ride for the 2008 season in the newly renamed Nationwide Series, as his No. 35 team had folded. Smithfield Foods served as the sponsor for 30 races, and Hamilton drove to a fifteenth-place points finish with two top-ten finishes. Boris Said drove the 25 for two road course races with No Fear sponsorship.

Part-time (2009-2011)
The No. 25 returned for one race in 2009, at ORP with Hamilton Jr. driving.

In 2010, the No. 25 raced at Richmond and Charlotte with Kelly Bires behind the wheel and Raybestos as the sponsor.

For 2011, the No. 25 team, with driver Kelly Bires, qualified for the Daytona race, but lack of funding caused them to start and park, only completing a few laps.

The last time they were seen at a racetrack was at Michigan which was going to be the Nationwide debut for Chad Finley. Unfortunately, Finley crashed the car in practice and the team did not have a backup, so they were forced to withdraw.

Craftsman Trucks 
Team Rensi began fielding a Craftsman Truck team in 2000, after purchasing equipment from Dale Earnhardt, Inc. Driver Jimmy Hensley drove the mostly unsponsored No. 16 Chevrolet Silverado to a 13th-place finish in points. In 2001, Donohue began running the No. 16, but after three races, the team shut down due to sponsorship issues. Randy Tolsma drove the No. 61 that year and was tenth in points when his team closed as well due to financial problems. He ran one final Truck race for Rensi in 2002 (driven by Butch Miller), finishing 18th in a Marine-sponsored truck at Martinsville Speedway, the last race for Rensi's truck program.

References

External links 
Team Rensi Motorsports
Ed Rensi Owner Statistics
Sam Rensi Owner Statistics
Gary Weisbaum Owner Statistics

1999 establishments in North Carolina
American auto racing teams
Companies based in North Carolina
Defunct NASCAR teams
ARCA Menards Series teams